Marcos da Silva, proper name of Mark of Lisbon (died 1591), Portuguese Franciscan, historian, and Bishop of Porto

Marcos da Silva or Marco da Silva may refer to:

Arts
Marco da Silva
Marco Da Silva (dancer), German-born American dancer and choreographer of Portuguese origin

Sports
Marcos da Silva
Marcos da Silva (footballer) (born 1986), Brazilian football striker
Marcos Antônio da Silva Gonçalves (born 1987),  Marquinhos, Brazilian footballer 
Marcos Antônio Senna da Silva (born 1976), a.k.a. Marcos Senna or just Senna, Brazil-born Spanish professional footballer 
Marcos Arouca da Silva (born 1986), a.k.a. Arouca, Brazilian footballer
Marcos Aurélio Fernandes da Silva (born 1977), Brazilian footballer
Marcos Paulo Segobe da Silva (born 1980), a.k.a. Careca, Brazilian footballer 
Marcos Roberto da Silva Barbosa (born 1982), a.k.a. Marquinhos, Brazilian footballer 
Marcos Roberto Nascimento da Silva (born 1981), a.k.a. Marcos Tamandaré, Brazilian footballer
Alfredo Marcos da Silva Junior, known as Marcão (born 1986), Brazilian footballer
Antônio Marcos da Silva (born 1977), a.k.a. Marquinhos Paraná or just Marquinhos, Brazilian footballer

Marco da Silva
Marco da Silva (French footballer), French footballer
Marco da Silva (Swedish footballer) (born 1982), former Swedish footballer

Marco Silva
Marco Silva, Portuguese football player and manager